Maan Jao Naa (meaning "Believe then!") is 2018 Pakistani, romantic comedy film, directed by Aabis Raza and produced by Muhammad Khalid Ali. The film is jointly written by Ahsan Raza Firdousi and Asma Nabeel. It stars Elnaaz Norouzi, Adeel Chaudhry and Ghana Ali in leads.

Principal photography took place between January and March 2017. The film was released on 2 February 2018 under the Hum Films banner.

Cast
Muhammad Ejaz as Faris's father
Elnaaz Norouzi as Rania
Adeel Chaudhry as Faris
Ghana Ali as Selina
Ayaz Samoo as Asim
Hajra Yamin as Sara
Naeem Haq
Asif Raza Mir as Rania's father
Asma Abbas as Neelo
Sabahat Ali Bukhari as Faris's mother

Release
On 21 November 2017 the film had its trailer released online. The film was released in Pakistan on 2 February 2018. World television premier of the movie was held by Geo Entertainment on Eid ul Adha 2018.

Critical reception
For The Express Tribune, Yusra Jabeen rated 3.5 out of 5 stars and said, "Maan Jao Naa is visually pleasing and demands very little of your mental energy." Shafiq Ul Hasan rated only 1.5 stars out of 5 and said, "With storytelling that fails to engage, sloppy performances that fail to impress, and pathetic dialogues backed by forgettable music which fails to entertain, Maan Jao Naa is no less than a disaster." Umair Sohail of Dunya News said, "It is hard to imagine the reason why one would make such a movie." Omair Alavi of VeryFilmi rated 2.5 out of 5 stars and said that the film "fails to impress when it comes to storytelling as whatever happens on the screen used to happen decades ago". Hamza Khalid of HIP commented that it "fails at building characters and drags around for way too long."

Music

References

External links

2018 films
Pakistani romantic comedy films
2010s Urdu-language films
Hum films
2018 romantic comedy films